Aristea is a genus of evergreen, perennial and rhizomatous species of flowering plants in the family Iridaceae, first described in 1789. The genus is distributed in tropical and southern Africa, as well as Madagascar. The genus name is derived from the Greek word arista, meaning "awn".

 Species

 Aristea abyssinica  Pax
 Aristea africana  (L.) Hoffmanns.
 Aristea alata  Baker
 Aristea anceps  Eckl. ex Klatt
 Aristea angolensis  Baker
 Aristea angustifolia  Baker
 Aristea bakeri  Klatt
 Aristea bequaertii De Wild.
 Aristea biflora  Weim.
 Aristea cantharophila  Goldblatt & J.C.Manning
 Aristea capitata  (L.) Ker Gawl.
 Aristea cistiflora  J.C.Manning & Goldblatt
 Aristea cladocarpa  Baker
 Aristea compressa  Buchinger ex Baker
 Aristea cuspidata  Schinz
 Aristea dichotoma  (Thunb.) Ker Gawl.
 Aristea djalonis  A.Chev. ex Hutch.
 Aristea ecklonii  Baker
 Aristea elliptica  Goldblatt & A.P.Dold
 Aristea ensifolia  J.Muir
 Aristea fimbriata  Goldblatt & J.C.Manning
 Aristea flexicaulis  Baker
 Aristea galpinii  N.E.Br. ex Weim.
 Aristea glauca  Klatt
 Aristea goetzei  Harms
 Aristea grandis  Weim.
 Aristea humbertii  H.Perrier
 Aristea inaequalis  Goldblatt & J.C.Manning
 Aristea juncifolia  Eckl. ex Baker
 Aristea kitchingii  Baker
 Aristea latifolia  G.J.Lewis
 Aristea lugens  (L.f.) Steud.
 Aristea madagascariensis  Baker
 Aristea montana  Baker
 Aristea monticola  Goldblatt
 Aristea nana  Goldblatt & J.C.Manning
 Aristea nigrescens  J.C.Manning & Goldblatt
 Aristea nyikensis  Baker
 Aristea oligocephala  Baker
 Aristea palustris  Schltr.
 Aristea parviflora Baker
 Aristea pauciflora  Wolley-Dod
 Aristea platycaulis  Baker
 Aristea polycephala  Harms
 Aristea pusilla  (Thunb.) Ker Gawl.
 Aristea racemosa  Baker
 Aristea ranomafana  Goldblatt
 Aristea recisa  Weim.
 Aristea rigidifolia  G.J.Lewis
 Aristea rupicola  Goldblatt & J.C.Manning
 Aristea schizolaena  Harv. ex Baker
 Aristea simplex  Weim.
 Aristea singularis  Weim.
 Aristea spiralis  (L.f.) Ker Gawl.
 Aristea teretifolia  Goldblatt & J.C.Manning
 Aristea torulosa  Klatt
 Aristea zeyheri  Baker

References

Further reading
 Goldblatt, P. 1995. Notes on Aristea Aiton (Iridaceae: Nivenioideae): Taxonomy, Chromosome Cytology, and Phylogeny. Annals of the Missouri Botanical Garden, Vol. 82, No. 1 (1995), pp. 139–145 
 Goldblatt, P., Dold, A. P., Manning, J. C. 2005. Three cryptic new species of Aristea (Iridaceae) from southern Africa.. Bothalia 4:121-128.
 Goldblatt, P. John C. Manning and Roy E. Gereau. 2002. Nomenclatural Clarification in Aristea Section Racemosae (Iridaceae) in the Cape Flora of South Africa Novon, Vol. 12, No. 2 (Summer, 2002), pp. 190–195 
 W. Marais. 1987. Notes on Aristea (Iridaceae) in East Africa. Kew Bulletin, Vol. 42, No. 4, p. 932

Iridaceae genera
Iridaceae
Flora of Africa